Leonard Barrie Corbin (born October 16, 1940) is an American actor. He is best known for his starring role as Maurice Minnifield on the television series Northern Exposure (1990–1995), which earned him two consecutive Primetime Emmy Award nominations.

His other notable credits include the films Urban Cowboy (1980), Stir Crazy (1980), WarGames (1983), and No Country for Old Men (2007), as well as the television series Dallas (1979–1984), Lonesome Dove (1989), One Tree Hill (2003–2009), The Closer (2007–2012), The Ranch (2016–2020), and Yellowstone (2021).

Early life
Corbin was born in Lamesa, the seat of Dawson County, south of Lubbock in West Texas. He is the son of the former Alma LaMerle Scott (1918–1994), a teacher, and Kilmer Blaine Corbin, Sr. (1919–1993), a school principal, judge, and Democratic member of the Texas State Senate for two terms, from 1949 to 1957. 

His mother gave him his middle name in honor of author J. M. Barrie. He played football briefly in eighth grade, but soon moved to the arts, including acting and ballet classes. He graduated from Monterey High School. Corbin studied theatre arts at Texas Tech University in Lubbock. 

At 21, he joined the United States Marine Corps, served two years, and then returned to Tech.

Career
Corbin began his career in the 1960s as a Shakespearean actor, but today is more likely to be seen in the role of the local sheriff, military leader, or some other authority figure, though on occasion, he has portrayed murderous villains. To moviegoers, he is well remembered as General Beringer in WarGames, John Travolta's uncle Bob Davis in Urban Cowboy, co-starring with Clint Eastwood in Any Which Way You Can, or Roscoe Brown, July Johnson's bumbling deputy in the acclaimed Western Lonesome Dove.

From 1979 until 1984, Corbin appeared in several episodes of Dallas as Sheriff Fenton Washburn. In 1983, he co-starred in the television miniseries The Thorn Birds. Corbin played Mary Carson's stockman Pete, who teaches the Clearys' sons how to shear sheep on their aunt's gigantic sheep station Drogheda, in Australia. Also in 1983, Corbin played Merit Sawyer in the NBC television series Boone, cancelled after 10 episodes. Corbin's role was that of a stern father to the young actor Tom Byrd, who played Boone Sawyer, an aspiring singer.
 
From 1990 to 1995, Corbin portrayed former astronaut and local business leader Maurice Minnifield on CBS's Northern Exposure, for which he received an Emmy Award nomination.

In 1994, Corbin narrated the acclaimed TBS documentary MoonShot, telling the story of the 1960s space race from the first-person viewpoint of Mercury Seven astronaut Deke Slayton. From 2007 to 2012, Corbin appeared in the recurring role of Clay Johnson, father of Deputy Chief Brenda Leigh Johnson on The Closer.

Corbin played the role of General Carville in consecutive video games developed by Westwood Studios. In 1998, Red Alert: Retaliation. In 2000, Command & Conquer: Red Alert 2 and the 2001 expansion, Command & Conquer: Yuri's Revenge.

In 2003, Corbin co-starred with Northern Exposure castmate John Cullum in Blackwater Elegy, a short film written by Matthew Porter and co-directed by Porter and Joe O'Brien.

From 2003 to 2009, Corbin played Whitey Durham, the basketball coach for the Tree Hill Ravens on The WB/CW teenager drama series One Tree Hill. He also had a role in 2007's Oscar-winning film No Country for Old Men. 

Corbin lost most of his hair in the 1990s due to alopecia areata. Since then, he has played various roles with a shaved head, wearing a cowboy hat, or occasionally wearing a full toupee. 

Corbin is the signature voice of radio station KPLX in Fort Worth, Texas, and has also voiced trailers and promotions for CMT and various other country radio stations. In 2014, he became the spokesman for the Texas Veterans Land Board. He also played a role in the Netflix series The Ranch. 

In 2020, Corbin had a recurring guest role as Everett Acker in Better Call Saul.

Personal life
Corbin has won many cutting-horse competitions. Much of his spare time is spent riding horses and tending to cattle on his small ranch near Fort Worth. He has volunteered his time to charity for many years, including rodeos and being spokesman for the National Alopecia Areata Foundation. In 2006, he participated in the Lubbock centennial.

Corbin lives on the ranch with his wife, Jo. Corbin's daughter Shannon had been adopted as an infant; her birth mother, who had a relationship with Corbin in college, gave up the child through the Methodist Mission Home in San Antonio, without having told Corbin of the pregnancy. Corbin found Shannon in June 1991, when she was 26. Corbin has three sons: Bernard Weiss, Jim Corbin, and Christopher Corbin.

In 2009, Corbin was inducted into the Texas Cowboy Hall of Fame in Fort Worth, Texas. A recent painting of Corbin has been placed at the museum exhibit. Corbin has appeared at gatherings of the American Cowboy Culture Association, which holds the annual National Cowboy Symposium and Celebration each September in Lubbock.

In September 2011, Corbin was given a lifetime achievement award by the Estes Park Film Festival in Estes Park, Colorado. The Texas Film Hall of Fame inducted Corbin into its membership on March 8, 2012.

Filmography

Film

Television

Video games

References

External links

Archival Materials

 Barry Corbin papers at Southwest Collection/Special Collections Library, Texas Tech University

1940 births
American male film actors
American male television actors
Living people
Texas Tech University alumni
United States Marines
People from Lamesa, Texas
Male actors from Fort Worth, Texas
People from Lubbock County, Texas
Male Western (genre) film actors
Monterey High School (Lubbock, Texas) alumni
20th-century American male actors
21st-century American male actors
Texas Democrats